This is a list of players to play for the Brisbane Bears in the Australian Football League (AFL).

Brisbane Bears players

1980s

1990s

Listed players who did not play a senior game for Brisbane

See also
 Category of Brisbane Bears players
 AFL Tables Full List of Brisbane Bears Players

Brisbane Bears

Brisbane Bears
Brisbane Bears